Kidan may refer to:

Khitan people, ancient nomadic people who lived on the territory of present-day Mongolia and Manchuria
Adam Kidan, American businessman
Tesfaye Gebre Kidan (1935–2004), Ethiopian general